Frazee is a city in Becker County, Minnesota, United States. It is the second-most-populous city in Becker County. The population was 1,335 at the 2020 census.

History
The community was originally named Detroit and later Third Crossing before adopting its name of Frazee. With Becker County not formally organized until 1871, it was the earliest settlement in the area. The city was officially incorporated on January 6, 1891. It was named after R. L. Frazee, owner of a sawmill.

Frazee was the birthplace of Kieth Engen (1925-2004), a noted operatic bass who had a highly successful career in Germany.

Geography

Demographics

2010 census
As of the census of 2010, there were 1,350 people, 540 households, and 325 families residing in the city. The racial makeup of the city was 88.1% White, 1.6% African American, 5.1% Native American, 0.6% Asian, 0.2% from other races, and 4.4% from two or more races. Hispanic or Latino of any race were 2.4% of the population.

There were 540 households, of which 34.1% had children under the age of 18 living with them, 41.1% were married couples living together, 13.3% had a female householder with no husband present, 5.7% had a male householder with no wife present, and 39.8% were non-families. 34.1% of all households were made up of individuals, and 16.3% had someone living alone who was 65 years of age or older. The average household size was 2.39 and the average family size was 3.00.

The median age in the city was 36.7 years. 25.9% of residents were under the age of 18; 8.1% were between the ages of 18 and 24; 24.2% were from 25 to 44; 23.5% were from 45 to 64; and 18.5% were 65 years of age or older. The gender makeup of the city was 45.4% male and 54.6% female.

Government
The City of Frazee is governed by the Statutory City Plan A form of government (in Minnesota, 601 cities operate under Plan A). One of the features of this plan is that it removes the clerk from the council and replaces that position with a fourth (or sixth) elected council member. Another feature is that the council appoints the clerk and treasurer for indefinite terms of office. A mayor and four council members are elected to three-year terms. The city council meets on the second Monday of each month in the Fire Hall.

Business and industry

The three largest employers in Frazee are Frazee-Vergas Public Schools (160 employees), Frazee Care Center (160), and Daggett Truck Line (102). Daggett Truck Line has been operating for 80 years out of Frazee, carrying refrigerated and dry freight throughout the United States and southern Canada. The company transports frozen foods, snack foods, pet food, produce and manufactured goods from Minnesota to most major cities in the midwest and throughout the United States. These trucks return with processed foods or raw materials for local manufacturers.

Transportation
Major roads are U.S. Route 10, a four-lane divided highway connecting the twin cities of Minneapolis-Saint Paul to the east and Fargo-Moorhead to the west; and Minnesota State Highway 87, a two-lane secondary road running east from the city.

Frazee is located on the Northern Pacific Railway's former main line, now the Northern Transcon of the BNSF. In 2015, this line was carrying an average of 49 trains per day.

The world's largest turkey

The city is best known as the home of "Big Tom: the World's Largest Turkey." Frazee has long been a part of the turkey industry. In 1984, turkey growers and committee members got together and decided to put up a giant turkey statue to honor the town. At the cost of $20,000 to build, the group commissioned artist Shell Scott to construct the statue which was built on a metal frame and covered in cement, fiberglass, cardboard, and insulation.

Due to Big Tom's physical makeup, the statue needed frequent repairs. There were also complaints that Big Tom was not proportioned like a real turkey. The area committee decided that they needed a new Big Tom and commissioned artist Dave Oswald. On July 1, 1998, during the removing process for Big Tom, the statue caught fire from a cutting torch, which was being used to remove the wings.

On September 19, 1998, a new statue arrived in Frazee in three pieces on a flatbed trailer. It weighs over 5,000 pounds, having 1,000 pounds of steel reinforcement. It has 3,000 to 4,000 separate fiberglass feathers, which took the D.W.O. Fiberglass Company over 2,000 hours to make.

References

Cities in Becker County, Minnesota
Cities in Minnesota